M Abdur Rashid is a Awami League politician and the former Member of Parliament of Noakhali-8.

Career
Rashid was elected to parliament from Noakhali-8 as an Awami League candidate in 1973.

References

Awami League politicians
Living people
1st Jatiya Sangsad members
Year of birth missing (living people)